The 2012 Kazakhstan Super Cup was the fourth Kazakhstan Super Cup, an annual football match played between the winners of the previous season's Premier League, Shakhter Karagandy, and the previous season's Kazakhstan Cup, Ordabasy, with the latter winning on 1–0. This was both teams first appearance in the Kazakhstan Super Cup.

Astana were the defending champions as winners of the 2011 Kazakhstan Super Cup, but did not qualify for this edition, as they failed to win either the Premier League or the Kazakhstan Cup.

Match details

See also
2011 Kazakhstan Premier League
2011 Kazakhstan Cup

References

FC Shakhter Karagandy matches
FC Ordabasy matches
2012
Supercup